Major Amarkai Amarteifio is a Ghanaian retired soldier, lawyer, sports administrator and politician. He served as Ghana's Minister for Youth and Sports during the Provisional National Defence Council era.

Politics 
Amarteifio was appointed by Jerry Rawlings, then Chairman of the Provisional National Defence Council (PNDC) to serve as Secretary for Youth and Sports. He served in that role from 1983 – 1987.

Sports administration 
Amarteifio is currently the board chairman of Accra Great Olympics.

References 

Living people
Sports ministers of Ghana
20th-century Ghanaian lawyers
Ghanaian soldiers
Ghana Army personnel
Year of birth missing (living people)